Azanus mirza, the pale babul blue or mirza blue, is a butterfly of the family Lycaenidae. It is found in the Afrotropical realm.

Its flight period is year-round but mainly between September and March.

The larvae feed on Acacia and Allophylus species.

References

mirza
Butterflies of Africa
Lepidoptera of Cape Verde
Butterflies described in 1880